Aberffrwd is a village in Monmouthshire, Wales. It lies above the River Usk just off the A40 between Llanvihangel Gobion and Clytha. The population of the village at the 2011 census was 620.

References

Villages in Monmouthshire